Tomáš Klus (born 15 May 1986) is a Czech musician and songwriter from the Moravian-Silesian Region of the Czech Republic.

Life and career
Klus was born in the industrial town of Třinec, where he spent most of his childhood. His parents were folk music fans, and he accompanied them to many concerts and music festivals. Growing up he was heavily influenced by musicians Karel Plíhal, Karel Kryl and in particular Jaromír Nohavica, who is still a major influence on Klus' music.

Klus moved to Prague aged 15 to pursue a sporting career, and was a member of the gold medal winning team in modern pentathlon in the 2002 European championship. However, he later became more interested in performance art and music. 

In 2007 he was the winner of the Czech Talent Zlín competition. In 2008 he released his debut album, Cesta do záhu(d)by. The single "Do Nebe" was played on Czech Radio before the album was released. He also wrote music for the Czech film Anglické jahody ("English Strawberries").

In September 2012 he graduated in drama from the Faculty of the Academy of Performing Arts (DAMU) in Prague.

In 2011 he released a song called "Pánu bohu do oken" ("Into God's windows") a song critical of Czech politics and the behaviour of Czech politicians. It was performed live at Český slavík 2011, a mainstream Czech music awards ceremony. On 26 September 2011, his album Racek was released. It debuted at number one in Czech Album Sales Chart and it was certified Gold in its first week on sale. Racek spent 23 non-consecutive weeks at number one. It was the best selling album of 2011 in the Czech Republic, and later certified diamond.

Tomáš Klus' latest album, entitled Proměnamě, was released on 24 March 2014. It debuted at number one in Czech Album Sales Chart.

Discography
Albums:
 Cesta do záhu(d)by (February 2008, Sony BMG)
 Hlávní uzávěr splínu (2009)
 Racek (2011)
 Proměnamě (2014)
 Anat život není (2015)

Awards and certifications

Awards 

 2008 – Anděl – The best new act
 2009 – Anděl – Singer of the year
 2010 – TV Óčko Music Awards – Singer of the year
 2011 – OSA Award – The most successful young artist
 2011 – Český slavík Awards – Silver award (2nd place) in category of Male singers
 2011 – Anděl – Singer of the year
 2011 – Anděl – Album of the year award for "Racek"
 2011 – Anděl – The best selling album of the year award for "Racek"
 2011 – Žebřík Awards – Album of the year award for "Racek"
 2011 – Žebřík Awards – Male singer of the year – 2nd place
 2011 – Žebřík Awards – Song of the year award for "Nina"
 2011 – TýTý Awards – Male singer of the year – 2nd place
 2011 – TýTý Awards – The best new artist
 2012 – Český Slavík Awards – Winner in category of Male

Certifications 
 2009 – Gold album for selling more than 6,000 copies of  "Cesta do záhu(d)by"
 2010 – Gold album for selling more than 8,000 copies of "Hlavní úzavěr splínu"
 2011 – Platinum album for selling more than 12,000 copies of "Hlavní uzávěr splínu"
 2011 – Gold album for selling more than 6,000 copies of "Racek"
 2011 – Platinum album for selling more than 12,000 copies of "Racek"
 2011 – Double platinum album for selling more than 24,000 copies of "Racek"
 2012 – Diamond album for selling more than 50,000 copies of "Racek"

References

External links
 Tomas Klus @ Mtv.co.uk
 Tomas Klus official website
 Anglicke Jahody (English Strawberries)
 Czech Talent Zlin 2007 results
 Tomas Klus profile on Osobnosti.cz

1986 births
Living people
Musicians from Třinec
Czech songwriters
Folk-pop singers